Kaine Harling (born March 25, 1977) is an Australian film producer and cameraman. His filmography includes Chopper, Ned Kelly, Big Mamma's Boy, The Lookalike and Sugar Mountain.

Harling divides his time between Melbourne, Los Angeles and Oslo, Norway.

Early life
Born Kaine Francis Harling in Melbourne, Australia, he is the second child of Jo (née Roche) and James Harling. He has an older brother, Adam, and younger sister, Jodie.

He produced, directed, shot and edited his first short film at the age of 16. Titled Robbie's Christmas, it was awarded first place at the Victorian Youth Film Festival in 1993.

Career
After working on several productions as a camera technician, Harling became a freelance cameraman in 2001. Since then, ha has worked on feature films, television commercials, music videos, short films and television series. He began producing feature films after moving to Hollywood in 2012.

Harling has produced three feature films, titled The Lookalike, Sugar Mountain and Broken Ghost. The Lookalike and Sugar Mountain had successful releases theatrically in the United States and on Netflix internationally.

He is the co-creator, with the creative director Michael Tan, of the Perception Agency, a content creation and digital marketing agency in Melbourne.

Filmography
 Chopper (2000)
 Crackerjack (2002)
 Ned Kelly (2003)
 Three Dollars (2005)
 Big Mamma's Boy (2011)
 The Lookalike (2014, producer)
 Sugar Mountain (2016, executive producer)
 Broken Ghost (2018, executive producer)

References

External links

Kaine Harling at Hollywood.com
Kaine Harling at CelebrityImages.org

Australian film producers
1977 births
Living people